The Ministry of Tourism (Arabic: وزارة السياحة) is a cabinet ministry of Yemen.

List of ministers 
 Moamar al-Eryani (18 December 2020 – present)
 Mohamed al-Qubati (18 September 2016 – December 2020)
 Moamar al-Eryani (7 November 2014 – September 2016)

See also 
Politics of Yemen

References 

Government ministries of Yemen